Arash Abbasi (born in 1978 in Malayer) is an Iranian screenwriter, director and actor.

Early life
Abbasi started his work in 1990 at his hometown School. In 1998 he moved to Tehran to Study Drama. He got BA in Dramatic literature from Azad University of art and architecture. In 2012 he Went to Bologna and take place in university of bologna to get his MA in The Rules of the Theatre.

Activities
Abbasi has wrote 25 stage plays and directed 15 plays in Iran and Italy. His work Named Nevisandeh Mordeh Ast (The Writer Is Dead) has been translated to German and Italian and has been performed in different cities of Italy. He is the writer of several TV series such as Istgah-e Seh Rahi (Three-Way Station), TV Film Gharibeh (Stranger) and he was the Assistant Director of TV Series such as Tajrobeh (Experience) and Khaneh-ee Dar Tariky (The House In The Darkness). He is also the writer of Gahi (Sometimes) screenplay. He took participate in  Giuseppe Tornatore  Directing Workshop (2013).

Earlier in 2016, Abbasi was invited to the Italian city of Bologna to stage his play "The Lady” during an Iranian Cultural Festival Titled “Heart of Persia”. Teatri di Vita, an international center for theater and contemporary arts in Bologna, was the main organizer of the festival. The Lady was also performed in Iran with Sanam Naderi as The Lady in Italian Language. In autumn 2017, Abbasi’s Groupe Moj collaborated with Italian theater expert and choreographer Claudia Castellucci in a joint performance.

He was the consulter of Italian Theater Film works in 2016. In 2018 He was nominated in Fajr International Theater Festival  for Best Director and Best Playwright – National Competition A for the play  Anna Karenina  free Adapted from the famous novel Anna Karenina by the Russian author Leo Tolstoy. In 2019 he nominated at Fajr International Theater Festival for Best Playwright – Radio Plays Competition for the play written by the wind. In 2019 he also selected for 16th Sedicicorto International Film Festival jury in Italy.

In 2019 he was the writer of the Popular TV Series Paytakht SE06.

Artistic Management Records

Stage plays

Scripts

See also 
 Wikipedia Farsi

References

External links

 

Iranian male stage actors
Iranian male writers
Living people
1978 births
20th-century Iranian writers
21st-century Iranian writers
Iranian screenwriters
Iranian film directors
People from Malayer
Islamic Azad University alumni
University of Bologna alumni
Iranian diaspora film people